Strigister is a genus of clown beetles in the family Histeridae. There are at least two described species in Strigister.

Species
These two species belong to the genus Strigister:
 Strigister simoni (Lewis, 1889)
 Strigister tecolotito Caterino, Tishechkin & Proudfoot, 2013

References

Further reading

 
 
 

Histeridae
Articles created by Qbugbot